Pancolitis, in its most general sense, refers to inflammation of the entire colon.  This can be caused by a variety of things.  Pancolitis or universal colitis is frequently used in a more specific fashion to denote a very severe form of ulcerative colitis. This form of ulcerative colitis is spread throughout the entire large intestine including the right colon, the left colon, the transverse colon, descending colon,  and the rectum. A diagnosis can be made using a number of techniques but the most accurate method is direct visualization via a colonoscopy. Symptoms are similar to those of ulcerative colitis but more severe and affect the entire large intestine. Patients with ulcerative colitis generally exhibit symptoms including rectal bleeding as a result of ulcers, pain in the abdominal region, inflammation in varying degrees, and diarrhea (often containing blood). Pancolitis patients exhibit these symptoms and may also experience fatigue, fever, and night sweats. Due to the loss of function in the large intestine patients may lose large amounts of weight from being unable to procure nutrients from food. In other cases the blood loss from ulcers can result in anemia which can be treated with iron supplements. Additionally, due to the chronic nature of most cases of pancolitis, patients have a higher chance of developing colon cancer.

Pancolitis is a kind of inflammatory bowel disease (IBD) that affects the entire internal lining of the colon. The precise causes of this inflammatory disorder are unclear, although physicians currently believe that autoimmune diseases and genetic predispositions might play a role in its progress. Genes that are known to put individuals at risk for Crohn’s disease have been shown to also increase risk of other IBD including pancolitis. Furthermore, an individual may also develop pancolitis if ulcerative colitis of only a small portion of the colon is left untreated or worsens. Current treatment of pancolitis is focused on forcing the disease into remission, a state where the majority of the symptoms subside. Ultimately, the goal is to reach an improved quality of life, reduction in need for medicine, and minimization of the risk of cancer. Medication utilized in treatment includes anti-inflammatory agents and corticosteroids to alleviate inflammation and immunomodulators which act to suppress the immune system. Immunomodulators are used in severe cases of ulcerative colitis and often utilized to treat patients with pancolitis who have shown little improvement with anti-inflammatories and corticosteroids. However, in this case it can further expose the patient to other diseases due to the compromised immune system. A final option of treatment is available in the form of surgery. Generally, this option is reserved for only the cases in which cancer development is highly suspected or major hemorrhaging from ulcers occurs. In this case the entire colon and rectum are removed which both cures the pancolitis and prevents any chance of colon cancer. Patients who undergo surgery either must have their stool collect in a reservoir made in place of the rectum or have the end of the small intestine attached to the anus. In the latter case the diseased portion of the anus must be removed, but the muscles are left intact, allowing bowel movement to still take place.

References

External links
 Medscape UC
 Patient UK UC

Gastrointestinal tract disorders